William Bouverie, 1st Earl of Radnor FRS (26 February 1725 – 28 January 1776) was a British peer, styled Hon. William Bouverie from 1747 until 1761.

He was the eldest son of Jacob Bouverie, 1st Viscount Folkestone and Mary Clarke, and was educated at University College, Oxford.

On 8 November 1750, he was appointed a deputy lieutenant of Wiltshire. On 22 September 1758, he was appointed a deputy lieutenant of Berkshire. He succeeded his father as Viscount Folkestone on 17 February 1761 and in the office of Recorder of Salisbury on 14 April 1761. On 31 October 1765, he was created Earl of Radnor and Baron Pleydell-Bouverie.

Radnor was appointed a Fellow of the Royal Society on 17 December 1767. He was elected governor of the French Hospital in 1770, the first of nine earls of Radnor to serve successively in this capacity.

Private life
He married, firstly, Harriet Pleydell, daughter of Sir Mark Stuart Pleydell, Bt, on 14 January 1748. They had one son:
Jacob Pleydell-Bouverie, 2nd Earl of Radnor (4 March 1750 – 27 January 1828)

He married, secondly, Rebecca Alleyne, daughter of John Alleyne, on 5 September 1751, by whom he had three sons:
Hon. William Henry Bouverie (30 October 1752 – 1806)
Hon. Bartholomew Bouverie (29 October 1753 – 31 May 1835)
Hon. Edward Bouverie (20 September 1760 – 30 December 1824)

He married, thirdly, Anne Hales, daughter of Sir Thomas Hales, 3rd Baronet and widow of Anthony Duncombe, 1st Baron Feversham, on 22 July 1765.

References

1725 births
1776 deaths
People from Wiltshire
People from Vale of White Horse (district)
Alumni of University College, Oxford
Bouverie, William
Bouverie, William
Bouverie, William
Deputy Lieutenants of Berkshire
Deputy Lieutenants of Wiltshire
Earls of Radnor
Fellows of the Royal Society